Kari O Komal (Bengali: কড়ি ও কোমল; English:  Sharps and Flats) is a Bengali poetry book written by Rabindranath Tagore in 1886. It consists of 83 poems.

Dedication 
Tagore dedicated this book to his elder brother, Satyendranath Tagore.

List of poems 
The poems of Kari o Komal are:

 Puratan
 Jogia
 Mathuray
 Shanti
 Patra
 Khela
 Biraha
 Sarabela
 Gaan
 Khanik milan
 Chumban
 Charan
Deher milon
Hriday-akash
Nidritar chitra
Shranti
Moh
Marichika
Ratri
Sindhugarbha
Astaman rabi
Swapnarudhha
Kobir ahankar
Satya
Khudra ami
Chiradin
Ahabangeet
Kobir mantabya
Nutan
Kangalini
Baner chaya
Pasani maa
Birahir patra
Basanta-abasan
Baki
Akankhha
Choto phul
Gitochwas
Bibasana
Hriday-akash
Tanu
Kalpanar sathi
Kalpanamadhup
Bondi
Pabitra prem
Gaan-rachana
Boitarani
Khudra ananta
Astachaler parapare
Akhamata
Bijone
Atmabhiman
Prarthana
Bangabhumir prati
Shesh katha
Pran
Upakatha
Bhabisyater rangabhumi
Kothay
Hridayer bhasa
Mangalgeet
Banshi
Bilap
Tumi
Joubanswapna
Stan
Bahu
Anchaler batas
Smriti
Hasi
Purna milan
Keno
Pabitra jibon
Sandhyar biday
Manabhridayer basana
samudra
Pratyasha
Jagibar chesta
Sindhutire
Atma-apaman
Basanar phand
Bangabasir prati
Sanjojan

References

External links 

 rabindra-rachanabali.nltr.org
 bn.m.wikisource.org

1886 poetry books
Bengali poetry collections
Poetry collections by Rabindranath Tagore

Indian_poetry_books
Rabindranath_Tagore